Rudbar-e Kharkhun (also Romanized as Rūdbār-e Khārkhūn; also known as Rūdbār) is a village in Garmab Rural District, Chahardangeh District, Sari County, Mazandaran Province, Iran. At the 2006 census, its population was 185, in 32 families.

References 

Populated places in Sari County